This list of Haverford School people catalogs notable alumni of The Haverford School, a private school in Haverford, Pennsylvania.


Academia, art, and media
 Robert M. Ayres – architect active in San Antonio; son of Atlee Ayres
 Lyle Bettger – actor 
 Jennifer Finney Boylan — author; transgender activist
 Chuck Brodsky – folk artist and activist
 Alec Brownstein – humorist and author
 Douglas Brunt – entrepreneur and novelist, married to Megyn Kelly
 Britton Chance, 1931 – Olympic gold medalist in sailing; University of Pennsylvania professor of biochemistry, biophysics, physical chemistry, and radiological physics
 John DiIulio, 1976 – political science professor at the University of Pennsylvania; first director of the Office of Faith-Based Initiatives initiated by President George W. Bush
 Henry Drinker – attorney and musicologist
 Al Hunt, 1960 – managing editor of Bloomberg News
 Arthur Crew Inman – diarist 
 James Lavino, 1991 – composer
 Walter Mellor – architect
 John Powers Middleton – television and film producer
 Peter Morris, 1991 – playwright; author of Guardians
 Maxfield Parrish, 1898 – painter and illustrator
 Eric Thal, 1983 – stage and film actor
 Frank S. Welsh, 1958 – President of Welsh Color and Conservation, Inc.; son of artist and furniture decorator Suzanne S. Welsh
 Bradley Whitford – actor; attended but did not graduate

Government

 Ben T. Elliott – speechwriter for politicians and corporations
 Douglas Hemphill Elliott – member of House of Representatives
 Oscar Goodman, 1957 – Mayor of Las Vegas, Nevada
 John Hickenlooper, 1970 – United States Senator, former Mayor of Denver and Governor of Colorado, 2020 Democratic Party presidential candidate.
 W. Thacher Longstreth, 1937 – former Philadelphia City Councilman

Sportspeople

 Shizz Alston, 2019 - collegiate basketball player for Temple and professional basketball player 
 Bert Bell, 1914 – NFL commissioner and founder of the Philadelphia Eagles
 Will Barker – former offensive tackle for the Dallas Cowboys
 Ernest Cozens, 1907 – football player, President of the Eastern Intercollegiate Boxing Association
 John duPont – member of the prominent Du Pont family; ornithologist, philatelist, philanthropist, coach, and sports enthusiast
 Bob Folwell – football player and coach
 Bill Fritz – pole vaulter
 Mike Mayock, 1976 – former NFL player and NFL analyst, current General Manager of the Oakland Raiders
 Steve Sabol, 1960 – President of NFL Films
 Henry Sayen – cricketer
 Dave Stilley – lacrosse player in Major League Lacrosse
 Jeremiah White, 2000 – professional soccer player

Business

 Michael Dubin, 1997, – founder and CEO of Dollar Shave Club
 Jeffrey E. Perelman – billionaire; CEO of JEP Management company
 Ronald Perelman, 1960 – billionaire; controlling owner of MacAndrews & Forbes
 John S. Middleton – former owner of John Middleton Co., part owner of the Philadelphia Phillies
 William McNabb- CEO of Vanguard Group

Military

 Maj. Gen. Smedley Darlington Butler, 1898 – two-time Medal of Honor recipient; USS Butler (DD-636) ; Major General in the US Marine Corps; Director of Public Safety in Philadelphia; political speaker and author; nicknamed "The Fighting Quaker"
 Robert Clarkson Clothier, Class of 1903, Wall Street Journal reporter; World War I Army officer; representative for Secretary of War; 14th president of Rutgers University (1932-1951); president of the New Jersey Constitutional Convention (1947)
 Pete Conrad – naval aviator, astronaut, 3rd man to walk on the Moon; attended Haverford from Kindergarten through 11th grade but was expelled as a result of his dyslexia. 
 Justin W. Lewis – music teacher
 James Rogers McConnell, 1908 – military aviator; a founding member of the Lafayette Escadrille in the French Air Service in World War I; honored by the Aviator statue at the University of Virginia and France's Croix de Guerre

Sciences
 Charles "Pete" Conrad – astronaut, third man to walk on the Moon; attended Haverford from kindergarten through 11th grade but was expelled because of his dyslexia.
 Richard W. Thorington Jr. – zoologist
 H. Richard Winn – neurosurgeon

Notable faculty

 Harold Boatrite – composer; former music teacher
 W. D. Ehrhart – poet, writer, scholar, Vietnam veteran; "the dean of Vietnam war poetry;" member of Vietnam Veterans Against the War; 1993 Pew Fellow in the Arts
 Joe Iacone – football coach
 Doug Knight – lacrosse coach and math teacher
 John Nagl – former headmaster of the school

References

Lists of American people by school affiliation